Colonel Francis Marcus Beresford (August 1818 – 1 August 1890) was a British Conservative Party politician

Early life and education
He was born at Aylestone, Leicestershire, the fourth son of Rev Gilbert Beresford and his wife Anne.
He was educated at King's College School, and went into business as a wharfinger.

Career
Beresford was commissioned into the 7th Surrey Rifle Volunteers (later 4th Volunteer Battalion, East Surrey Regiment). He became captain-commandant in February 1860 and was promoted major-commandant later the same month. In 1864 he was promoted lieutenant-colonel. By 1874 he was a colonel.

He was elected at a by-election in February 1870 as a Member of Parliament (MP) for Southwark.
He was re-elected in 1874, and held the seat until he stood down at the 1880 general election.

Personal life
He married twice.  Firstly, Elizabeth Green, the daughter of George Green, on 20 September 1848 at St. Oswald Parish Church, Durham.  They had six children.  Secondly, Eleanor Richardson on 2 June 1881 at St. George, Hanover Square, London.  His daughter Selina (1859–1938) married Sir Hay Frederick Donaldson, the son of Sir Stuart Donaldson.

He died on 1 August 1890 at Cliftonthorpe, Ashby-de-la-Zouch, Leicestershire, and is buried in Brompton Cemetery, London.

References

External links 

1818 births
1890 deaths
East Surrey Regiment officers
Conservative Party (UK) MPs for English constituencies
UK MPs 1868–1874
UK MPs 1874–1880
Burials at Brompton Cemetery
19th-century British people
People from Aylestone
19th-century British military personnel
People educated at King's College School, London